Spoy may refer to the following places in France:

Spoy, Aube, a commune in the department of Aube
Spoy, Côte-d'Or, a commune in the department of Côte-d'Or